Dog×Police is a 2011 Japanese film directed by Go Shichitaka, about a special division of the Tokyo Metropolitan Police Department which uses trained dogs in cases of terrorism, violent crime, and rescue missions. The film is based on the novel by Yoichi Komori.

Plot
Yusaku Hayakawa (Hayato Ichihara) dreamed of one day becoming a detective. Instead, he now works as a trainer for police dogs at the Tokyo Metropolitan Police Department. One day, Yusaku gets an Albino Shepherd named Shiro whom others say can never become a police dog due to a genetic disorder. Nevertheless, Yusaku and Shiro become attached as he trains Shiro to become a guard dog. Sometimes guard dogs are treated as equipment and other times required to become a human shield, but Yusaku and female police officer Natsuki (Erika Toda) are against this. A series of explosions then take place as a serial bomber strikes Tokyo.

References

External links
  

 

2011 films
2010s Japanese-language films
Police dogs in fiction
2010s Japanese films